Claudia Rosett is an American writer and journalist. A former staff writer for The Wall Street Journal, she writes a foreign affairs column for Forbes, blogs for PJ Media, makes guest appearances on television and radio, and is attached to the Independent Women’s Forum and the London Centre for Policy Research. Her recent work has focussed on North Korea, Iran, the United Nations and, with emphasis on merchant vessel tracking, methods of sanctions evasion.

Background
Rosett earned a BA in English at Yale University in 1976, an MA in English at Columbia University in 1979, and an MBA at the University of Chicago in 1981.

She joined The Wall Street Journal in 1984, becoming the editorial page editor at The Asian Wall Street Journal in 1986. From 1996 she worked in Moscow, first as a reporter for the Journal, then as Moscow Bureau Chief, before taking leave to live in India. In 1997 she returned to New York, where she served on the editorial board of The Wall Street Journal until 2002. She wrote a regular column, "The Real World", for The Wall Street Journal Europe and OpinionJournal.com from July 2000 to December 2005.

In 1990 she received an Overseas Press Club Citation for Excellence in recognition of her on-the-scene reporting of the Tiananmen Square protests of 1989.
In 1994 she broke the full story of North Korean labor camps in the Russian Far East, reporting from the camps.

Rosett has also written for National Review, The New York Times, The Philadelphia Inquirer, USA Today, Commentary, The New Republic and The Weekly Standard, among others.

On the United Nations
Rosett is a frequent critic of the United Nations. In 2004 and 2005, she wrote a series of articles exposing the corruption behind the U.N.'s Oil-for-Food program.  As Michael Barone, a senior writer at U.S. News & World Report,  explained:

The U.N. Oil for Food program, we learn from the reporting of Claudia Rosett in The Wall Street Journal, was a rip-off on the order of $21 billion—with money intended for hungry Iraqis going instead to Saddam Hussein and his henchmen, to bribed French and Russian businesses and, evidently, to the U.N.'s own man in charge, Benon Sevan. For this work, she was honored with the 2005 Eric Breindel Award for Excellence in Opinion Journalism and a "Mightier Pen" award from the Center for Security Policy.

In June and July 2006, Rosett covered the trial of Tongsun Park via a blog at the National Review's website.

References

External links
 Rosett's biography at the FDD website
 

Living people
The Wall Street Journal people
Yale University alumni
Columbia University alumni
Year of birth missing (living people)
University of Chicago Booth School of Business alumni